The Battle of Mühldorf (also known as the Battle of Ampfing) was fought near Mühldorf am Inn on September 28, 1322 between the Duchy of (Upper) Bavaria and Austria.  The Bavarians were led by the German king Louis of Wittelsbach, while the Austrians were under the command of his cousin, the anti-king Frederick of Habsburg.

Background
The early 14th century had the powerful dynasties of Habsburg, Luxembourg, and Wittelsbach rivaling for the rule over the Holy Roman Empire, while the prince-electors were anxious not to allow one noble family to install a hereditary monarchy. After the death of Emperor Henry VII of Luxembourg in 1313, the electoral college denied the succession of his son John of Bohemia and instead accorded its favor to Louis of Wittelsbach and Frederick of Habsburg, but were split over the question of whom to choose.

Therefore, in 1314, a double election took place at Frankfurt. Cologne, the Electorate of the Palatinate, Bohemia, and the Duchy of Saxe-Wittenberg voted for Frederick as Rex Romanorum. Mainz, Archbishopric of Trier, Brandenburg and Elector John II of Saxe-Lauenburg (whose electoral dignity was denied by their Saxe-Wittenberg cousins) adopted Louis.

The draw resulted in a protracted conflict with violent fights, in which both sides tried to gain the support of the Imperial estates. In addition, Louis had to settle the domestic dispute with his brother Count Palatine Rudolf I (who had voted against him), which finally ended with Rudolf's death in 1319. Meanwhile, Frederick continued his campaigns into Bavaria, devastating Louis' duchy several times without meeting much resistance.

The battle
In 1322, Frederick, encouraged by his previous expeditions, allied with the Bishop of Passau and the Salzburg Archbishopric. Their armed forces met on September 24 near Mühldorf on the Inn River, where Frederick expected the arrival of further troops from Further Austria, led by his brother Leopold.

The battle did not go well for the Austrians. Louis had forged an alliance with John of Bohemia and Burggrave Frederick IV of Nuremberg and on September 28 reached Mühldorf with a sizable army, including 1,800 knights and 500-600 mounted Hungarian archers. Meanwhile, Leopold's relief troops were barred from reaching the battlefield in time. Despite this unfavorable situation Frederick agreed to meet Louis' knights at once. His army was defeated by Louis' outnumbering forces under high losses on both sides. More than 1,000 noblemen from Austria and Salzburg were captured, as was Frederick himself and his younger brother, Henry the Friendly.

Aftermath
Though Louis had prevailed, his royal title remained contested, especially by Pope John XXII and Frederick's brother Leopold, who remained a fierce opponent. After three years Louis had to release Frederick from captivity and reconcile with him, even offering him a joint rule and the Rex Romanorum title in return for his support to receive the Imperial crown. Neither the House of Wittelsbach nor the Habsburgs were able to defend their claims to the royal title, which after Louis' death in 1347 again passed to Charles IV from the House of Luxembourg.

See also

Battle of Gammelsdorf

Notes

Sources
Delbrück, Hans, trans. Walter Renfroe Jr. History of the Art of War, Volume III: Medieval Warfare (Lincoln, NE: University of Nebraska Press, 1982)

Muhldorf 1322
Muhldorf 1322
14th century in Austria
1320s in the Holy Roman Empire
1322 in Europe
Conflicts in 1322
Louis IV, Holy Roman Emperor